Víctor Estrella and Santiago González became the first champions of this tournament, after their won 6–2, 6–4 against Harsh Mankad and Kaes Van't Hof in the final.

Seeds

Draw

Draw

References
 Doubles Draw
 Qualifying Draw

All Star Children's Foundation Sarasota Open - Doubles
2009 Doubles